Vitaly Venediktovich Scherbo (or Shcherbo; , or Shcherba; , Vital' Venjadziktavich Shcherba, born 13 January 1972) is a Belarusian former artistic gymnast. One of the most successful gymnasts of all time, he is the only male gymnast ever to have won a world title in all 8 events (individual all-around in 1993, team in 1991, floor in 1994, 1995 and 1996, horizontal bar in 1994, parallel bars in 1993 and 1995, pommel horse in 1992, rings in 1992, vault in 1993 and 1994). He was the most successful athlete at the 1992 Summer Olympics, winning 6 of 8 events – team, all-around, and 4 of 6 event finals.

Career
His first international performances were in 1990–1991, when he competed for the USSR team at the World Championship and the World Cup. He was the 1991 World All-Around silver medalist behind teammate Grigori Misutin; scored a perfect 10.0 on the vault at the European Championships in 1990; and starred at the Goodwill Games in Seattle. He had occasional bouts of inconsistency and as the 1992 Barcelona Olympics approached, the Unified Team coaches regarded him as less of a medal prospect than his more experienced and reliable teammates. In one of the most dominant performances in history, Scherbo won six out of the possible eight awarded gold medals at the 1992 Summer Olympics in Barcelona. His golds came in the team event, the all-around, pommel horse (tie), rings, vault, and parallel bars.

Soon after the 1992 Olympics, Scherbo married his wife Irina. However, life in Scherbo's native Belarus became increasingly turbulent, and his family was frequently victimized. Their apartment was burgled, wherein money, valuables, and Olympic memorabilia were stolen. No one was home at the time, and his six gold medals from Barcelona were safely at his mother's house.

The family promptly relocated to the United States, settling in State College, Pennsylvania. The move enabled them to take advantage of Scherbo's Olympic success. He followed up on his Olympic triumph by winning the 1993 World All-Around title, and the 1993 and 1994 American Cup.

On 13 December 1995, his wife Irina was involved in a single car accident, in which she skidded off a road, and slammed into a tree. She suffered multiple fractures to her ribs and pelvis, lapsed into a coma, and her internal injuries were so severe that doctors told her husband that she only had a 1 in 100 chance of surviving. Scherbo stopped his training altogether. He gained 15 pounds, and began abusing alcohol. After a month, Irina finally woke up from her coma, and insisted that her husband resume his training for the upcoming Olympic season. As his wife made a miraculous recovery, Scherbo similarly began to regain peak physical condition, winning yet another World title in 1996. At the 1996 Summer Olympics in Atlanta, his performances reflected his lack of preparation time, both due to his wife's accident and a recent shoulder surgery. His performances were marred by uncharacteristic mistakes, and the gold medals that had made him so famous were not forthcoming. Though Scherbo was clearly disappointed and frustrated at his inability to win gold, he was a decided crowd favorite, and they clearly viewed his four bronze medals as an impressive triumph after a tumultuous year.

Scherbo had planned to compete in the 1997 World Championships but broke his hand in a motorcycle accident before then and retired soon after.

Alleged rape 
In October 2017, former Ukrainian Olympic champion gymnast Tatiana Gutsu accused Scherbo of violently raping her when she was 15, when they were at the USSR national team training camp in 1991.

Eponymous skills
Scherbo (vault) – a Yurchenko-style vault defined by its unique entry, specifically a full twist within the back-handspring between the springboard and the vaulting table.

See also
 List of multiple Olympic gold medalists at a single Games
 List of multiple Olympic gold medalists
 List of Olympic medal leaders in men's gymnastics
 List of multiple Summer Olympic medalists

References

External links

 
 Vitaly Scherbo at Gymn Forum
 
 
 
  

1972 births
Living people
Gymnasts from Minsk
Soviet male artistic gymnasts
Belarusian male artistic gymnasts
World champion gymnasts
European champions in gymnastics
Medalists at the World Artistic Gymnastics Championships
Olympic gold medalists for the Unified Team
Olympic gymnasts of the Unified Team
Olympic bronze medalists for Belarus
Olympic gymnasts of Belarus
Gymnasts at the 1992 Summer Olympics
Gymnasts at the 1996 Summer Olympics
Olympic medalists in gymnastics
Belarusian emigrants to the United States
Medalists at the 1996 Summer Olympics
Medalists at the 1992 Summer Olympics
Universiade medalists in gymnastics
Universiade gold medalists for Belarus
Universiade silver medalists for Belarus
Competitors at the 1990 Goodwill Games
Originators of elements in artistic gymnastics
People convicted of domestic violence
Soviet rapists